The Rome apple (also known as Red Rome, Rome Beauty, Gillett's Seedling) is a cooking apple originating near Rome Township, Ohio, in the early 19th century. This apple remains popular for its glossy red color and for its utility in cooking.

Characteristics
The Rome is rounded, all red, and very glossy, with a thick skin and firm flesh. It is primarily used for baking, as its flavor develops when cooked, and it holds its shape well. It is commonly described as less desirable as an eating apple because of its subtle flavor that is not as sweet, flashy, or tart as some other varieties. It comes to market in late September and is considered a good keeper.  Rome apples are widely grown and available, and are a staple variety in American commerce.

Origins
The story is given that in 1817 Joel Gillet (also spelled "Gillett" or "Gillette" by his descendants) found a seedling tree in a shipment from a nursery. His son planted the tree on the banks of the Ohio River in  Rome Township near Proctorville, Ohio where several years later it was found producing red fruit. His cousin, Horatio Nelson Gillett took cuttings and started a nursery to promote the apple. Originally known as "Gillett's Seedling", it was renamed the "Rome Beauty" in 1832 in honor of the township. The original tree survived into the 1850s until it was felled by erosion of the river bank.

Disease susceptibility
Scab: high
Powdery mildew: high
Cedar-apple rust: high
Fire blight: high

References

External links

 

National Fruit Collection page

Apple cultivars